Ancoa is a river, tributary of the Achibueno, in Linares Province, Maule Region of Chile.

External links
Ancoa river, near Linares, Chile
 Rivers of Chile website Ancoa River

Rivers of Maule Region
Rivers of Chile